Seyyed Mehdi Hashemi is an Iranian former military officer and conservative politician who was formerly a member of the Parliament of Iran representing Tehran, Rey, Shemiranat and Eslamshahr. He is currently President of the Shooting Federation Islamic Republic of Iran.

He also served as the deputy to the Minister of Transportation, being appointed on 24 September 2008 and caretaker of the Minister of Interior. On 29 August 2005, Hashemi was failed to gain a vote of confidence as the Welfare and Social Security Minister.

References

1964 births
Living people
Members of the 9th Islamic Consultative Assembly
Deputies of Tehran, Rey, Shemiranat and Eslamshahr
Front of Islamic Revolution Stability politicians
Islamic Revolutionary Guard Corps personnel of the Iran–Iraq War